The 4th Canadian Women's Hockey League All-Star Game took place on January 20, 2019, at Scotiabank Centre in Toronto, Ontario, Canada. The event featured three 20-minute periods. 

Brigitte Lacquette served as captain for Team Purple, while goaltender Liz Knox was the captain for Team Gold. Former NHL goaltender Curtis Joseph served in the capacity of head coach for Team Purple, with Cheryl Pounder serving as assistant coach. Glenn Healy was the head coach with Team Gold, as Charline Labonte took on the role of assistant coach.

News and notes

Fan balloting
All-Star captains were selected via an online fan vote. Calgary Inferno blueliner Brigitte Lacquette secured over 90 percent of the vote to be named one of the captains. Lix Knox, a goaltender from the Markham Thunder, finished in second place in the overall vote, gaining the chance to serve as the second All-Star captain.

Players named
The rosters announced in three different press releases. The first press release announcing the group of All-Stars was issued on December 3, 2018.

First round

Second round

Third round

References 

Canadian Women's Hockey League
2017 Canadian Womens Hockey League All-Star Game
2018–19 in Canadian women's ice hockey
2019 in Toronto